
Gmina Sokolniki is a rural gmina (administrative district) in Wieruszów County, Łódź Voivodeship, in central Poland.

Villages
Gmina Sokolniki contains the villages and settlements of Bagatelka, Borki Pichelskie, Borki Sokolskie, Góry, Góry-Parcela, Gumnisko, Kopaniny, Maksymów, Malanów, Nowy Ochędzyn, Pichlice, Prusak, Ryś, Siedliska, Sokolniki, Stary Ochędzyn, Szustry, Tyble, Walichnowy, Wiktorówek, Wyglądacze, Zagórze and Zdzierczyzna.

Neighbouring gminas
Gmina Sokolniki is bordered by the gminas of Biała, Czastary, Galewice, Lututów and Wieruszów.

References
Polish official population figures 2006

Sokolniki
Wieruszów County